Pytt Geddes (born Gerda Meyer Bruun; 17 July 1917 – 4 March 2006) was responsible for bringing t'ai chi to the UK. She taught classes at The Place in London.

She was born in Bergen, Norway, the daughter of a successful businessman and politician who served in the Norwegian government as Minister of Trade.  During World War II, she joined the Norwegian resistance movement.

After she and David Geddes married in 1948, they moved to Shanghai, where she discovered t'ai chi.  Soon after, the People's Liberation Army took power there. Around 1951, they were able to move to Hong Kong, where she studied t'ai chi with Choy Hawk Pang, and then with his son Choy Kam Man.

She became a friend of Benjamin Britten and Peter Pears.

She studied psychology in the US and underwent Reichian analysis in Oslo.

Selected publications

References

Further reading

External links
 

 Interview with Gerda Geddes
 Tributes to Geddes

1917 births
2006 deaths
Body psychotherapy
Psychotherapists
Tai chi practitioners
Norwegian female martial artists